Monstrotyphis singularis is a species of sea snail, a marine gastropod mollusk in the family Muricidae, the murex snails or rock snails.

Description
The length of the shell attains 6.3 mm.

Distribution
This marine species occurs off New Caledonia.

References

  Bouchet P.; Fontaine, B. (2009). List of new marine species described between 2002-2006. Census of Marine Life.

External links
 Houart, R. (2002). Description of a new typhine (Gastropoda: Muricidae) from New Caledonia with comments on some generic classifications within the subfamily. Venus. 61 (3-4): 147-159

Monstrotyphis
Gastropods described in 2002